The 1963–64 international cricket season was from September 1963 to April 1964.

Season overview

November

Commonwealth XI in Pakistan

December

South Africa in Australia

January

International Cavaliers in the West Indies

England in India

February

South Africa in New Zealand

March

India in Ceylon

References

International cricket competitions by season
1963 in cricket
1964 in cricket